The 2019 McDonald's All-American Boys Game was an All-star basketball game that was played on Wednesday, March 27, 2019 at the State Farm Arena in Atlanta, Georgia, home of the Atlanta Hawks. The game's rosters featured the best and most highly recruited high school boys graduating in the class of 2019. The game was the 42nd annual version of the McDonald's All-American Game first played in 1977. Cole Anthony of the East had 14 points, five rebounds and seven assists, and was named the game's most valuable player (MVP).

The 24 players were selected from 2,500 nominees by a committee of basketball experts. They were chosen not only for their on-court skills, but for their performances off the court as well. Coach Morgan Wootten, who had more than 1,200 wins as head basketball coach at DeMatha Catholic High School, was chairman of the selection committee.

Rosters
When the rosters were announced on January 24, 2019, Arizona, Duke, Florida, Kentucky, and Villanova had two selectees, while the rest of the schools had one. At the announcement of roster selections, only 13 schools were represented and had 6 players uncommitted. The two highest rated players (Cole Anthony) was named to the East team. The West team was highlighted by (James Wiseman). On January 21, Isaiah Stewart committed to Washington during the 2019 Spalding Hoophall Classic. 
On February 11, Anthony Edwards committed to play for Georgia. On April 19, Matthew Hurt committed to Duke (joining Moore and Carey Jr). On April 23, Cole Anthony committed to North Carolina. (joining Bacot) On May 17, Achiuwa committed to Memphis. On May 20, Watford committed to LSU. On May 21, McDaniels committed to Washington.

Team East

Team West

^undecided at the time of roster selection
~undecided at game time
Reference

Box Score

References

McDonald's All-American Boys Game
Basketball in Atlanta
McDonald's All-American
McDonald's All-American